Almasiani is a village in the historical region of Khevi, north-eastern Georgia. It is located on the banks of the river Tergi and its right bank tributary river Bidara. Administratively, it is part of the Kazbegi Municipality in Mtskheta-Mtianeti. Distance to the municipality center Stepantsminda is 18 km.

Climate

Sources 
 Georgian Soviet Encyclopedia, V. 1, p. 319, Tbilisi, 1975 year.

References

Kobi Community villages